Scaevola canescens is a species of plant in the family Goodeniaceae. It is endemic to Western Australia where it occurs "from Shark Bay to Perth, in open forest and heath in sandy soil".

Description
The fruit is usually one-seeded.

Distribution
It grows in the IBRA regions: Avon Wheatbelt, Geraldton Sandplains, Jarrah Forest, Swan Coastal Plain, and Yalgoo.

Etymology
The specific epithet is Latin:
canescens,-entis (part.B): canescent, “grayish-white. A term applied to hairy surfaces” (Lindley); “hoary with gray pubescence” (Fernald 1950); becoming gray, grayish; in mosses, hoary due to the collective hyaline hair points on the apices of leaves.

Taxonomy
S. canescens was first described by George Bentham in 1837. A holotype (W0047196) was collected by von Hügel at King Georges Sound, and is kept at Naturhistorisches Museum Wien Botanische Abteilung (W).  The earliest Australian record (MEL 1521288A) was collected by J.A.L. Preiss on April 15, 1839, somewhere in the vicinity of Perth.

References

canescens
Taxa named by George Bentham
Endemic flora of Western Australia
Plants described in 1837
Taxobox binomials not recognized by IUCN